James Tinn (23 August 1922 – 18 November 1999) was a British Labour Party politician.  Tinn was educated at Ruskin College and Jesus College, Oxford and became a teacher. He was a branch secretary of the National Union of Blastfurnacemen and a committee member of the North Cleveland association of the National Union of Teachers.

At the 1964 general election, he was returned to the House of Commons as Member of Parliament for Cleveland, and held the seat until its abolition for the February 1974 election. He was then elected in the new Redcar constituency, holding the seat until his retirement at the 1987 election.  During this time Arthur Taylor, a local Labour Party councillor and later leader of Langbaurgh Borough Council, acted as Tinn's agent in three successful General Elections.

Tinn never attained ministerial office, but was a parliamentary private secretary from 1965.

References

External links 
 

1922 births
1999 deaths
Labour Party (UK) MPs for English constituencies
National Union of Blastfurnacemen-sponsored MPs
Alumni of Jesus College, Oxford
UK MPs 1964–1966
UK MPs 1966–1970
UK MPs 1970–1974
UK MPs 1974
UK MPs 1974–1979
UK MPs 1979–1983
UK MPs 1983–1987